Cyclophora hyponoea is a moth in the family Geometridae. It was described by Louis Beethoven Prout in 1935. It is found in Portugal, Spain, north-eastern Algeria and northern Tunisia.

References

External links
Lepiforum e.V.

Moths described in 1935
hyponoea
Moths of Africa
Moths of Europe
Taxa named by Louis Beethoven Prout